DYHB (747 AM) RMN Bacolod is a radio station owned and operated by the Radio Mindanao Network. The station's studio is located at RMN Broadcast Center, 17th Lacson St., Bacolod, while its transmitter is located at Sitio Aning, Brgy. Pahanocoy, Bacolod.

References

Radio stations established in 1964
News and talk radio stations in the Philippines
Radio stations in Bacolod